Richard D. Robinson (1921 – September 5, 2009) was an American educator.

References

External links 
 Richard D. Robinson obituary at Alpha Delta Phi
 Richard Robinson, Sloan professor emeritus, 88 obituary at MIT News
 Richard D. Robinson  obituary at Academy of International Business

1921 births
2009 deaths
20th-century American educators
American male journalists
20th-century American journalists